The 2018 Pan American Aerobic Gymnastics Championships were held in Lima, Peru, from November 29 to December 1, 2018. The competition was organized by the Peruvian Gymnastics Federation, and approved by the International Gymnastics Federation.

Medalists

Senior

References

Pan American Aerobic Gymnastics Championships
International gymnastics competitions hosted by Peru
Pan American Aerobic Gymnastics Championships
Pan American Aerobic Gymnastics Championships
Pan American Aerobic Gymnastics Championships
Pan American Gymnastics Championships